The Springfield Paper is an online only newspaper that serves Springfield, Ohio and Clark County, Ohio. It is a Christian oriented newspaper. 
It is published by Penda Publishing.
Its editor is David Reeves, a Minister and owner of Penda Publishing and Philadelphia Ministries.

Newspapers published in Ohio
Springfield, Ohio